The Little Princess and the Poet is one of Evelyn Sharp's many fairytales, written in 1898.This short children's story sends the message that beauty is not always seen on the surface but found within the heart of a person. It is part of Sharp's popular story collection, All the Way to Fairyland.

Plot summary

There once was a poet who was unable to do anything useful and instead spent all of his time writing poetry. Unfortunately, the poet was not particularly nice to look at and was often sent away because people could not bear to look at his ugly features. As a result, he traveled from place to place singing his poetry to people who did not listen. During his travels the poet visited a city he had never been to before and, as usual, he went immediately to the poor, because it was about them that he always wrote. When they heard his poetry they grumbled and asked why he was telling them about their woes when they already knew all about them. Then they sent him up to the palace because the Princess was blind and enjoyed listening to poetry all day.
Thrilled that he was finally wanted somewhere, the poet went to the palace immediately. Upon his arrival, the guards at the gate initially turned him away because he was not as attractive as all of the other poets that had been to see the blind Princess. Luckily, the Princess heard the poet at the gate and sensed that he was a real poet - unlike all of the princes who claimed to be poets. She took the poet by the hand and took him up to the palace where the entire court was just sitting down to lunch.
The King and Queen, however, were less than overjoyed by the poets sudden appearance in their court. Despite their attempts to convince her, the Princess was adamant that he stay. Over lunch, the poet sang a poem about the poor and the hardships that they face. When he was done, everyone was stunned, and the forty five princes who claimed to be poets stood up and left, knowing that they were not real poets. When the Queen had recovered from the surprise, she tried to persuade the Princess that the poet had to leave because he was not suitable company for a Princess. Despite her objections, the poet knew it was true and told the Princess that he had to leave.

The poet went back to traveling, and one day came to a place far away from the blind Princess and sang of his love for her to the poor. When he was done, they told him that if he kissed the Princess on each eyelid while she was sleeping, her blindness would be cured, even though she had been blind since birth. He hurried back to the palace of the blind Princess and told her parents his purpose. Although they were unsure, they were also intrigued and agreed to let him try, on the condition that he left immediately after kissing her. Conveniently, the Princess was asleep in the garden at the time and the poet was able to kiss her. When she awoke, the Princess was no longer blind and asked to see all the beauty that she had been missing. However, nothing that she saw looked beautiful to her and she instead decided that she wanted to see something ugly. When she was told that there was nothing ugly in the Palace, the Princess went outside and came upon the poet who had been unable to stay away, and looking at him she finally found beauty.

About the Author

Evelyn Sharp (suffragist) born August 4, 1869, to a privileged family in London; She was the ninth of eleven children. Sharp was taught by her elder sisters before attending school in London, then attending a college in Paris in 1890. She is well known for both her children’s stories as well as her involvement as a suffragist. A versatile writer, Sharp was popular for writing schoolgirl fictions and fairy tales. Her schoolgirl tales were primarily based on her happy days in school, which Sharp recorded in her collection The Youngest Girl in the School. In her fairy tales, Sharp was known to appeal to the minds of children. Her attitude towards children was not patronizing, but respectful; she treated them as creative and intelligent and appealed to this aspect in her stories. She empathized with children, and viewed adults as irrational and strange. Her fairy tales were not moralistic and instead focused on issues of the day, like her changing views of gender, class, internationalism, and peace. Sharp also worked for the Manchester Guardian as a journalist for four decades and became the first regular contributor to its popular Women’s page. Her involvement in the suffrage movement began before the First World War. Sharp was involved in two major suffragist societies in Britain: the militant Women’s Social and Political Union and the United Suffragists, the latter of which she was a founder. Sharp edited the controversial newspaper Votes for Women. Her work as a pacifist and international humanitarian lead her to work with the Quakers in Weimar Germany, in the 1920s. She was twice imprisoned and refused to pay taxes on the grounds that as she did not have the vote therefore she should not have to pay. At the age of sixty-three, she married long time friend and fellow suffragist, Henry Nevinson. Sharp died in 1955 at the age of 86.

See also

Original Story
The Youngest Girl in the School

References

John, Angela V. [ Sharp, married name Nevinson, Evelyn Jane, (1869–1955), children's writer and suffragette], [Oxford Dictionary of National Biography], Oxford University Press 2004, online edn October 2009. February 6, 2013. 
John, Angela V. "Evelyn Sharp." : Rebel Woman 1869. The Edward Carpenter Forum, Aug. 2010. Web. 07 Feb. 2013. .

British fairy tales
1898 short stories
Fictional princesses
Fictional poets
Literary duos
Female characters in fairy tales
Male characters in fairy tales